Halcones de Xalapa is a basketball club based in Xalapa, Veracruz, Mexico that plays in the Liga Nacional de Baloncesto Profesional (LNBP).  Their home games were played at Gimnasio Universitario de la Unidad Deportiva. 

Former Michigan star and NBA player, Robert Traylor, played for Halcones UV Xalapa three months before his death in May 2011.

In 2015, Halcones withdrew from the LNBP due to financial problems.

Final roster
The following is the roster for the 2022 season:

Notable players

References

External links
Official site

Basketball teams established in 2003
Basketball teams disestablished in 2015
Defunct basketball teams in Mexico
Sports teams in Veracruz
Sport in Xalapa
2003 establishments in Mexico